Worthington is a civil parish within the Metropolitan Borough of Wigan, in Greater Manchester, England, about  north of Wigan. The parish is very sparsely populated, at the 2001 census having a population of 135, and does not have an active parish council or parish meeting.

It used to have a dyeworks and a colliery. Its parish church is Church of St Wilfrid, Standish. It is also the home of Worthington Hall.

Worthington Lakes lie within the Douglas Valley to the north of the village. The lakes, actually three reservoirs (Worthington, Arley and Adlington), were built in the mid-1800s to supply Wigan with drinking water. They are fed by the River Douglas, which originates on the moors above Rivington and whose natural course was diverted through a tunnel before the reservoirs were created, as it was not clean enough for drinking water. Today the lakes are part of a  country park, with a nature reserve and accessible footpaths.

See also

Listed buildings in Worthington, Greater Manchester

References

External links

Villages in Greater Manchester
Civil parishes in Greater Manchester
Geography of the Metropolitan Borough of Wigan